The standard IEC 61355-1 Classification and designation of documents for plants, systems and equipment describes rules and guidelines for the uniform classification and identification of documents based on their characteristic content of information.

It is applied for all documents within the life cycle of a technical products like plants, systems or equipment. It also includes non-technical documents. The main application is the construction, erection and operation of chemical plants and power plants, where the number of documents may sum up to some 100,000 documents.

Classification code 

The standard provides with the document kind classification code (DCC) a structured letter-code for the classification of any kind of document.

The document kind classification code consists of three code-letters A1, A2, A3, with the prefix "&".
 A1 Letter code for technical area class
 A2 Letter code for main class
 A3 Letter code for sub-class

The letter code A1 is optional, if all documents are from the same technical area. The letter codes A2 and A3 are identical for all technical areas.

Technical Areas 
The technical areas are:

Classes
The main classes are:

Main classes and subclasses

Table of main classes and subclasses

Source: IEC 61355-1

References

External links 
 

61355